Manjeet Singh (10 October 1988) represented India the Men's Lightweight Double Sculls at the 2008 and 2012 London Olympics.  In 2008, his teammate was Devender Khandwal and in 2012, it was Sandeep Kumar.

References

Indian male rowers
Rowers at the 2008 Summer Olympics
Rowers at the 2012 Summer Olympics
Olympic rowers of India
Living people
Asian Games medalists in rowing
1988 births
Rowers at the 2010 Asian Games
Rowers at the 2014 Asian Games
Asian Games silver medalists for India
Medalists at the 2010 Asian Games
Recipients of the Dhyan Chand Award